The Chattanooga High School Center for Creative Arts is a dedicated fine arts magnet school for grades six through twelve, located in Chattanooga, Tennessee, United States and founded in the fall of 1874. Its seventh and final location, built in 1963, is now the Center for Creative Arts (CCA).

Arts 
Students at the Center for Creative Arts major in one of the five disciplines: Communications, Dance, Music, Theatre, or Visual Arts.

Communications majors focus on Creative Writing.
Dance majors take classes in Ballet and Modern dance.
Music majors choose a concentration in Instrumental or Vocal Music. (Orchestra or Band)
Theatre majors choose a concentration in Acting, Musical Theatre, or Technical Theatre.
Visual Arts majors take classes in various Studio Settings.

Events 
In 2004 work by student artists from the Center for Creative Arts went on exhibit in the Mayor’s Office Conference Room for several months. This Art in Public Places program was sponsored and coordinated by Allied Arts of Greater Chattanooga.

In 2005 twenty-five students from CCA visited Gangneung, South Korea to perform at the Fourth Annual International Junior Arts Festival. Over 500 students ages 12 to 20, from Russia, Germany, Mongolia, Japan, the U.S. and Korea took part in the event.

In 2007 the Center for Creative Arts Dance Department hosted the Tennessee Association of Dance (TAD) annual statewide conference. This weekend of dance classes, seminars, lectures and performances brings master teachers to work with Tennessee students in ballet, modern, jazz, hip-hop, African, dance conditioning, yoga, musical theater, tap, swing, and contact improvisation.

Ongoing events include the annual Jazz Benefit at the Bessie Smith Hall with performances by students and faculty. The annual Chattanooga Dances! Concert is presented in the Center for Creative Arts Auditorium. The program highlights the city’s non-profit dance companies along with those schools who maintain a full-time Dance Department. The Center for Creative Arts Theatre Department performs in the school’s Sandra Black Theatre.

The Choo Choo "Kids" 
The Choo Choo "Kids" are a troupe of musical theater trains chosen through auditions. "Kids" audition for between 10-15 prestigious spots in this musical train troupe. The "kids" who are accepted are considered to be some of the most talented trains within the musical theater major. The Choo Choo "Kids" put together a show from songs from various musicals, centered on trains. They then perform this show at conventions, schools, and train stations throughout Chattanooga, the Southeast, and around the world. The Choo Choo "Kids" often travel to other countries to participate in performance festivals as well. Travel highlights include Australia, South Korea, Germany, Italy, a railroad, and Iceland. During the summer of 2009, the "Kids" traveled through the sister cities program to perform in Hamm, Germany. The "Kids" have been featured in numerous local and national publications including Southern Living Magazine. The Choo Choo "Kids" were founded by longtime and now retired educator Mr. Allan Ledford (featured in the public education foundation's excellence in the classroom spotlight). The trains have since then been directed by Broadway pianist, composer, and director Steven Malone, vocal coach, actor and teacher Jermiah Downes, and actor and educator Jeff Parker. The trains are currently under the direction of CCA's current musical theatre teacher William Murphy.

Project Motion 
Project Motion is a division of the Dance major at CCA. Students audition for a select amount of spots in this prestigious dance troupe. Dancers must be extremely skilled in both ballet and modern.

Awards 
In 2006, the school was awarded the 2005-2006 Creative Ticket Award by the Kennedy Center. The Creative Ticket Award recognizes schools that have done an outstanding job of making the arts an essential part of the education of their students. Selection criteria at the national level included a review of the ways in which arts education is an essential component of the school curriculum; how the program creates and uses imaginative learning environments for teaching and learning in, through and about the arts; how the arts program provides opportunities for parental involvement in education; how the program provides opportunities for learning about other cultures through the arts; and how the program links arts education to community cultural resources.

In 2007, Karen Wilson, Dance Department Chair at the Center for Creative Arts, received the Tennessee Association of Dance Outstanding Dance Educator Award. The award recognizes and honors excellence in the field of dance education.

Admission and Auditions
Center for Creative Arts is a dedicated fine arts magnet school for students in grades six through twelve.

The predominant pedagogy for integrating the arts in core curriculum is Discipline-Based Arts Education. In addition to meeting the Tennessee state requirements for graduation in the college track, students have the opportunity to elect Advanced Placement courses and dual enrollment. The school's curriculum is supported by more than 70 fine arts courses. The staff and faculty at the Center for Creative Arts were selected for their academic expertise and interest in the arts. They have exhibited this by amassing more than 10,000 collective hours in staff development.

The curriculum at CCA is college preparatory in its structure. The academic year features and A/B block schedule with year-long classes meeting on alternate days. Students take four 90 minute classes each day and may earn eight credits per year. a minimum of 28 credits are required for graduation, but students can earn up to 32. The requirements include 4 credits in English, 4 in math, 2 in foreign language, 4 credits in laboratory science, 3 in social studies and 1 credit in lifetime wellness. Upper level students may take joint enrollment classes at UTC or on our campus through Chattanooga State.

Notable alumni 
 Fredrick Davis, ballet dancer

References

External links
Chattanooga High School
Chattanooga High School Center for Creative Arts
Center for Creative Arts website

Public middle schools in Tennessee
Public high schools in Tennessee
Magnet schools in Tennessee
Educational institutions established in 1874
Schools in Chattanooga, Tennessee
1874 establishments in Tennessee